James Ray Fuller (born August 5, 1969) is an American football coach and former defensive back who is currently the head coach of the Carolina Cobras of the National Arena League (NAL). He played college football at Walla Walla CC and Portland State before being selected in the 8th round of the 1992 NFL Draft; he went on to play three seasons with the San Diego Chargers and Philadelphia Eagles while also spending time in the World League of American Football (WLAF) for the Scottish Claymores and Arena Football League (AFL) for the Portland Forest Dragons. He later served as a coach for the Forest Dragons, Bakersfield Blitz, Philadelphia Soul, Dallas Desperados, Dallas Vigilantes, Richmond Raiders, Maine Mammoths, and Jacksonville Sharks.

Early life and education
Fuller was born on August 5, 1969, in Tacoma, Washington. He attended Stadium High School and after graduating from there played two years of college football at Walla Walla Community College. He transferred to Portland State University in 1990 and led the team with 104 tackles in his first year at the school. As a senior, Fuller made 84 tackles, four sacks, four interceptions and earned all-conference honors.

Professional career
Fuller was selected in the 8th round (201st overall) of the 1992 NFL Draft by the San Diego Chargers. He was placed on injured reserve to start the season. He returned to the team late in the season and appeared in one playoff game.

In , Fuller made the Chargers roster and appeared in ten regular season games as a backup, making eight tackles. The Chargers finished 8–8, missing the playoffs.

Fuller was released by San Diego in September  after being arrested for assault with a deadly weapon.

After spending  out of football, Fuller signed with the Scottish Claymores of the World League of American Football (WLAF) in 1996. He appeared in all ten games as a starter, making 47 tackles, one sack, and five interceptions for 46 yards. The Claymores won World Bowl '96 against the Frankfurt Galaxy.

Fuller's performance with the Claymores impressed enough for him to be signed back into the National Football League (NFL) by the Philadelphia Eagles. He appeared in 13 regular season games, two as a starter, and made 19 tackles and an interception. He also played in their one playoff game. He was re-signed in  but did not play.

In , Fuller played four games in the Arena Football League (AFL) for the Portland Forest Dragons, making 14 tackles and a pass defended.

Coaching career

In 2002, Fuller became the head coach of the Bakersfield Blitz in AF2. He led them to the Western Conference Championship in his first season. 

In , Fuller accepted a position as defensive coordinator of the Philadelphia Soul in the Arena Football League. After the fifth game of the  season, he was named interim head coach. As interim coach, he compiled a record of 4–7.

In , Fuller became wide receiver and defensive backs coach for the Dallas Desperados, where he served through .

In , Fuller was named defensive coordinator of the Dallas Vigilantes. He later became interim head coach, leading them to a 2–8 record.

Fuller was named head coach of the Richmond Raiders in 2011. He served in that position for five seasons and led them to a record of 37–24. He was named Professional Indoor Football League (PIFL) Coach of the Year in 2012 and 2015.

Fuller was named head coach of the Maine Mammoths in 2018, leading them to a 7–8 finish after a 1–7 start.

In 2019, Fuller became defensive coordinator of the Jacksonville Sharks. He was promoted to head coach in 2020, a position he served in until the end of the 2021 season.

Fuller was named offensive coordinator for the Carolina Cobras for the 2022 season.

On September 13, 2022, Fuller was promoted to Head coach by the Cobras.

References

1969 births
Living people
American football defensive backs
Portland State Vikings football players
San Diego Chargers players
Philadelphia Eagles players
Scottish Claymores players
Portland Forest Dragons players
Oklahoma Wranglers coaches
Philadelphia Soul coaches
Dallas Desperados coaches
Dallas Vigilantes coaches
Jacksonville Sharks coaches
Walla Walla Warriors football players